WYAC (930 AM) is a radio station licensed to serve Cabo Rojo, Puerto Rico.  The station serves as a satellite of WIAC 740 AM in San Juan and it is owned by Bestov Broadcast Group. It airs a News/Talk/Variety format.

The station was assigned the WYAC call letters by the Federal Communications Commission on October 31, 2003.
The station begins operations as WEKO, On January 9, 1970, founded by David Ortiz Cintron and was a repeater of NotiUno from 1982 until 1999. WYAC as a satellite of WIAC, produces local programming, including news segments which also listening all across Puerto Rico.

References

External links

News and talk radio stations in Puerto Rico
Radio stations established in 1970
Cabo Rojo, Puerto Rico
1970 establishments in Puerto Rico